The İsa Bey Mosque, constructed in 1374–75, is one of the oldest and most impressive works of architectural art remaining from the Anatolian beyliks. The mosque is situated on the outskirts of the Ayasluğ Hills at Selçuk, İzmir.

History
It was built by the architect, 'Ali b. Mushaimish Dımışklıoğlu, in honor of the Aydinid Isa Bey. The plans for the mosque are based on the Great Mosque of Damascus.

By 1829, the mosque was in ruins and by 1842 the minaret had fallen down. In the 19th century, it was also used as a caravanserai. There is an octagonal Seljuk türbe made of stone and bricks, with a pyramid shaped roof, right next to the mosque.

Architecture

The mosque has two main entrances, to the east and to the west and contains a fountain court. The western wall has inscriptions and geometric shapes engraved. These walls are covered with marble, whereas the façades on the remaining sides are made of cut stone. It is built asymmetrically on a  base. Twelve round columns stand inside its courtyard encircled with porches. Its brick minaret is built on an octagonal base, and the upper part from the balcony is ruined. The mosque had another minaret on the west, which is totally destroyed now. The mihrab (niche or altar) was moved to another mosque, due to a door opened there.

Gallery

See also
Aydinid dynasty
Anatolian beyliks
Islamic architecture
Islamic art
List of mosques
Timeline of Islamic history
 List of Turkish Grand Mosques

Notes

References
Bayrak, Orhan M. (1994). p. 407, Türkiye Tarihi Yerler Rehberi (expanded 3rd edition). İnkılâp Kitabevi. .

External links

 History and architecture of İsabey Mosque with many photos
 Images of the İsabey Mosque
 Over 30 pictures of the mosque

 A visit to the Isa Bey Mosque - Photos included

Mosques in İzmir
Mosques completed in 1375
Anatolian Beyliks architecture
Mosque buildings with domes